Scared Famous / Fast Forward are the third and fourth albums by American recording artist Ariel Pink (credited as "Ariel Pink's Haunted Graffiti"). They were originally released on cassette as a double album by Ariel in 2001. A compilation album of the material from both albums was subsequently released by Human Ear Music in 2007. It consisted of only 17 tracks selected from the original cassettes.

Some of the tracks from the original Scared Famous / Fast Forward release later appeared on the 2008 compilation Odditties Sodomies Vol. 1, and select tracks from were rerecorded for Pink's later albums; "Beverly Kills" on Before Today (2010) and "I Wanna Be Young" on Dedicated to Bobby Jameson (2017).

In 2021, the albums were reissued by Mexican Summer as one unified release with improved sound quality.

Critical reception

Reviewing the 2007 Scared Famous compilation, Pitchfork contributor  Andrew Gaerig wrote that it combined "random brilliance with sonic bullshit." He concluded, "The willfully negligent production and arrangement [from The Doldrums] remains, but viewed as a transition between his very early work and the slight improvements he'd made by House Arrest, they're nearly permissible."

Track listing

Original release

2007 – Human Ear Music reissue

2021 – Mexican Summer reissue

Credits
Scared Famous

 Ariel Pink – all vocals and instruments, except:
 R. Stevie Moore – strings and bass on "Express, Confess, Cover-Up"
 Jim Price Skeletons – drums on "Express, Confess, Cover-Up"
 Recorded between September 2000 and July 2001 at 1245 Norton St., Los Angeles, except "Express, Confess, Cover-Up": recorded in Nashville.

Fast Forward

 Ariel Pink – all vocals and instruments
 Recorded between October 2000 and July 2001

References

External links 

2001 albums
Ariel Pink albums
New Weird America albums
Albums recorded in a home studio
Self-released albums